Rico Louis Smith Jr. (born January 14, 1969) is a former American college and professional football player who was receiver in the National Football League (NFL) for five seasons. He attended and played college football for Cerritos College and later transferred to the University of Colorado at Boulder. A six-round draft choice selected by the Cleveland Browns in the 1992 NFL Draft, he played four years with the Cleveland Browns and one year with the New York Jets.

Personal life
Smiths' parents are Rico Smith Sr and Doris Smith. He has a sister named Akita. Smith has three children (three sons: Tiery, Troy, and Taijay).

Early years
Smith was born in Compton, California. He grew up playing baseball, football and running track in Long Beach and Carson. He graduated from Paramount High School, where he played football, basketball, baseball and track for the Paramount Pirates.

Links
https://web.archive.org/web/20141101230057/http://www.profootballhof.com/story/2005/1/1/2028/
http://www.nfl.com/player/ricosmith/2526062/profile
http://articles.latimes.com/1986-11-15/sports/sp-3632_1_paramount-high-school
http://www.cerritosfalcons.com/alumni/pros
http://www.cubuffs.com/fls/600/gameday/1990/tenn/curoster_depth.pdf
http://www.cleveland.com/brownshistory/plaindealer/index.ssf?/browns/more/history/19951022BROWNS.html
http://www.cleveland.com/brownshistory/plaindealer/index.ssf?/browns/more/history/19941002BROWNS.html

1969 births
Cleveland Browns players
New York Jets players
Players of American football from Compton, California
Living people
American football wide receivers
Colorado Buffaloes football players